The 1953 European Amateur Boxing Championships  were held in Warsaw, Poland from May 17 to May 24. The tenth edition of the bi-annual competition was organised by the European governing body for amateur boxing, EABA. There were 117 fighters from 19 countries participating.

Medal winners

Medal table

External links
Results
EABA Boxing
Amateur Boxing

European Amateur Boxing Championships
Boxing
European Amateur Boxing Championships
Boxing
Sports competitions in Warsaw
20th century in Warsaw
European Amateur Boxing Championships